The Charlier Museum is a museum in Saint-Josse-ten-Noode, a municipality of Brussels, Belgium, exhibiting Belgian art of the end of the 19th century. The museum is often used for concerts of classical music.

History
The current museum building was bought by an art collector Henri Van Cutsem in 1890. Van Cutsem hired Victor Horta, a famous architect, to remodel and extend the building. The renovation in the Art Nouveau style was completed in 1893. In 1904, Van Cutsem died and left the house to a sculptor Guillaume Charlier, who died in 1925 and in his will requested that the house and the collection be opened as a public museum. The museum was opened in 1928.

See also

 Art Nouveau in Brussels
 History of Brussels
 Culture of Belgium
 Belgium in "the long nineteenth century"

References

Notes

Museums in Brussels
Saint-Josse-ten-Noode
Art museums and galleries in Belgium